Azam Tariq  ( March 1962 – 6 October 2003) was the leader of the politico-religious organisation  Sipah-e-Sahaba Pakistan, a Deobandi  organization, which was officially banned by the government of Pakistan in August 2001. On 26 June 2018, Pakistan lifted the ban.

After his assassination in 2003, Muhammad Ahmed Ludhianvi was selected as the president of Sipah-e-Sahaba Pakistan.

Early life and education
Tariq was born to a poor Arain farmer Mohammad Fateh in village, Chak No 111/7R, Chichawatni. The family is originally from Nakodar, Jalandhar. 

He studied at a local madrassa and then enrolled in the Jamia Uloom-ul-Islamia in Banuri Town, Karachi.

Career
In August 2001, Pakistani president Pervez Musharraf banned seven alleged Islamic organizations, including Sipah-e-Sahaba, and Azam Tariq was arrested and jailed on charges of terrorism.

Azam Tariq was elected three times to the National Assembly of Pakistan in Jhang Sadr, even though his constituency was a predominantly Shi'a region. He contested again in the 2002 elections, while in custody, and was again elected. He was released in November 2002.

Assassination
Tariq was shot and killed in an attack on 6 October 2003 alongside Islamabad as he left the M-2 Motorway to enter the city. his funeral was led by Abdul Rashid Ghazi inside  Lal Masjid. 

The assassination was part of a growing wave of violent incidents in Pakistan between the sectarian Sunni and the Shiah Muslims. Violence peaked in July 2003 with the Quetta mosque attack and the massacre of more than 50 people.

On 11 May 2017, the Federal Investigation Agency (FIA) arrested a proclaimed offender after 13 years who murdered him.

Bibliography

Books by Tariq
Rūdād-i ʻishq o vafā, Jhang : Markazī Daftar-i Sipāh-i Ṣaḥābah, 1999-2004, around 1000 pages (in 2 volumes). Author's memoirs.
Ahammīyat-i ḥadīs̲ dar dīn, Kābul : Mayvand ; Peshawar : Kitābkhānah-ʼi Sabā, 2005, 298 p. Importance of Hadith for Islam, in Persian.
K̲h̲ut̤bāt-i jarnail, al-maʻrūf, K̲h̲ut̤bāt-i jel, Jhang : Markazī Daftar-i Sipāh-i Ṣaḥābah, 2001. Collection of speeches written in jail (1998-1999) collected by Abū Usāmah Z̤iyāurraḥmān Nāṣir.

Books about Tariq
Muḥammad Nadīm Qāsimī, Ḥayāt-i Aʻẓam T̤āriq, Faiṣalābād : Ishāʻatulmaʻārif, 1998, 413 p.
Muḥammad Nadīm Muʻāviyah, Pārlīmanṭ kā londa : S̲ānī-i jarnail-i Sipāh-yi Ṣaḥābah ... Ḥaz̤rat Maulānā Muḥammad Aʻẓam T̤āriq shahīd ke mufaṣṣal ḥālāt-i zindagī aur Pārlīmant kī taqārīr, Karāchī : Maktabah-yi K̲h̲ilāfat-i Rāshidah, 2005, 376 p.

See also
 Haq Nawaz Jhangvi 
 Isar-ul-Haq Qasmi

References

External links
 Shia News: a partisan account of Azam Tariq's release in 2001, with a background of the history of Sunni-Shia violence in Pakistan
 Pakistan Daily Times 7 October 2004
 Shia News report of Azam Tariq's assassination
 An Eye for an Eye? Azam Tariq's assassination news by Newsline (Pakistan).

1962 births
2003 deaths
Pakistani prisoners and detainees
Pakistani religious leaders
Pakistani MNAs 1990–1993
Pakistani MNAs 1993–1996
Pakistani MNAs 2002–2007
People from Chichawatni
History of Islam in Pakistan
Religiously motivated violence in Pakistan
Shia–Sunni sectarian violence
Deaths by firearm in Pakistan
Assassinated Pakistani Islamic scholars
Assassinated religious leaders
Pakistani far-right politicians
Deobandis
People murdered in Islamabad
Sipah-e-Sahaba Pakistan people
Jamia Uloom-ul-Islamia alumni
Chiefs of Sipah-e-Sahaba Pakistan